František Dvořák may refer to:
František Dvořák (painter) (1862–1927), Czech painter
František Dvořák (fencer) (1871–1939), Czech fencer
František Dvořák (archaeologist) (1896–1943)
František Dvořák (art historian) (1920–2015)